Ernst Walter Zeeden (born 14 May 1916 in Berlin; died 5 September 2011) was a German medievalist and a scholar of modern history.

Life 
Ernst Walter Zeeden was born in Berlin as the son of regional court director Konrad Zeeden (1879–1925)  and his wife Marianne. After he earned the Abitur at the Goethe-Gymnasium in Berlin, he studied history, German and Latin at the universities of Leipzig, Heidelberg, Munich and Freiburg. In Leipzig he was a member of student organisation Corps Saxonia Leipzig. In 1939, he earned a doctor's degree (Dr. phil) with his thesis Hardenberg und der Gedanke einer Volksvertretung in Preußen 1807–1812 under the supervision of Gerhard Ritter. On November 4, 1948, he married Pauline Dubbert in Freiburg. They had five children. 

Zeeden was habilitated at the University of Freiburg in 1947 and became an associate professor there in 1954. In 1957, he was called to the University of Tübingen. He became an Emeritus in 1984. Even though he originated from a Protestant family, Zeeden converted to Roman Catholicism and joined the Order of the Holy Sepulchre in Freiburg on May 9th, 1954. His wife and his sister remained Protestant.

Zeeden was buried at the Bergfriedhof in Tübingen.

Career 
In Tübingen, Zeeden took part to the foundation of the first Collaborative Research Centres for Geisteswissenschaften (lit. 'sciences of mind') of the German Research Foundation (DFG). The Center was co-founded with historians Josef Engel and Heiko Oberman, and its activity focused on the history of the Late Middle Ages and the Reformation.

In his life, Zeeden wrote about the Reformation and Confessionalization era. His research lead to a re-assessment of that period by German and European historians. His writings, his overall approach of all confessions, as well as his thesis about the Catholic traditions in 17th and 18th-century Lutheranism were well-received abroad.

Zeeden opened new research fields with his books about the emergence of confessions, Martin Luther and the "Hegemonial Wars and Confession Struggles" of the series Propyläen-Geschichte Europas.

Zeeden's scientific legacy is preserved by the Ulm City Archive, where it spans over a 11-meter-long library sector.

Moreover, Zeeden supervised 70 new doctorate theses and educated ten university professors, including Johannes Burkhardt, Helga Schnabel-Schüle and Wolfram Siemann. He was himself a student of Gerhard Ritter and a relative of Max Weber.

Selected works 
 Hardenberg und der Gedanke einer Volksvertretung in Preußen 1807–1812. Berlin: Ebering, 1940 (also: phil. dissertation, University of Freiburg, 1939).
 Martin Luther und die Reformation im Urteil des deutschen Luthertums. 2 vol., Freiburg: Herder, 1950–52.
 Katholische Überlieferungen in den lutherischen Kirchenordnungen des 16. Jahrhunderts. Münster: Aschendorff, 1959.
 Die Entstehung der Konfessionen. München: Oldenbourg, 1965.
 Das Zeitalter der Glaubenskämpfe. München: Deutscher Taschenbuch-Verlag, 1973 (pocket edition of the 9th edition of Gebhardt. Handbuch der deutschen Geschichte.
 Propyläen-Geschichte Europas. vol. 2: Hegemonialkriege und Glaubenskämpfe, Berlin: Propyläen Verlag, 1977, .
 Europa im Zeitalter des Absolutismus und der Aufklärung. Stuttgart: Klett-Cotta, 1981, .
 Europa im Umbruch. Von 1776 bis zum Wiener Kongress. Stuttgart: Klett-Cotta, 1982, .
 Konfessionsbildung. Studien zur Reformation, Gegenreformation und katholischen Reform. Stuttgart: Klett-Cotta, 1985, .

References

Bibliography

External links
 
Ernst Walter Zeeden, Zentrale Datenbank Nachlässe, Bundesarchiv (in German)
 "Maßgeblich an der Etablierung des Fachteilgebiets „Geschichte der Frühen Neuzeit“ beteiligt", a tribute to Ernst Walter Zeeden by Anton Schindling (15 October 2011, in German).

20th-century German historians
German medievalists
Historians of the modern period
Reformation historians
Academic staff of the University of Tübingen
Knights of the Holy Sepulchre
German Roman Catholics
Writers from Berlin
1916 births
2011 deaths